Elections were held in the Colony of Queensland (now a State of Australia) between 4 November 1873 and 4 December 1873 to elect the members of the Legislative Assembly of Queensland.

Key dates
Due to problems of distance and communications, it was not possible to hold the elections on a single day.

See also
 Members of the Queensland Legislative Assembly, 1873–1878

References

Elections in Queensland
1873 elections in Australia
1870s in Queensland
November 1873 events
December 1873 events